Rebound is a 2005 American sports comedy film directed by Steve Carr. It stars Martin Lawrence as a disgraced college basketball coach who returns to his old middle school to coach the boys' basketball team.

This was also Tara Correa's only film role. She was murdered in a gang shooting on October 21, 2005, three months after the film's release.

Plot
Coach Roy McCormick was once college basketball's top mastermind. His attention began to turn to what endorsement contracts he could secure instead of actually coaching his team. Roy lets his temper get the best of him in most situations. After causing a mishap with a mascot, the board bans McCormick from collegiate basketball until he can show that he can control his anger. Roy's reputation has doomed him to being un-hireable as a long time passes with no job offers. However, McCormick then gets one job offer, from Mount Vernon Junior High School which was also where he graduated as a teenager. His alma mater's basketball team, the Smelters, is looking for somebody to coach the team, and the headmistress thinks an alumnus of his caliber in basketball would be ideal. 

Although irritated, Roy realizes he has no other options and accepts the coaching job, figuring this is the way to prove he can control his anger and get back into the spotlight of college basketball. As Roy begins coaching the squad, he gets into an embarrassing situation that he's never been in before and decides, enough is enough. He eventually starts teaching the concepts of basketball to his new team, albeit placing paramount emphasis on sportsmanship.  With teaching and learning being done between both Roy and the kids, the Smelters eventually start having success. Unexpectedly, this leads Roy to find out he's been missing his simple love of the game the whole time. Eventually Roy gains a new appreciation for his old school and figures that while it does not lead to big money endorsements, he can earn a comfortable living from this job.

Cast
 Martin Lawrence as Coach Roy McCormick / Preacher Don McCormick, Roy's identical twin brother
 Wendy Raquel Robinson as Jeanie Ellis
 Breckin Meyer as Tim Fink
 Horatio Sanz as Mr. Newirth
 Oren Williams as Keith Ellis, Jeanie's son
 Patrick Warburton as Larry Burgess
 Megan Mullally as Principal Mary Walsh
 Eddy Martin as One Love
 Steven Christopher Parker as "Sledgehammer" Big Wes
 Steven Anthony Lawrence as Ralph
 Logan McElroy as Fuzzy
 Gus Hoffman as Goggles
 Tara Correa as Big Mac
 Alia Shawkat as Amy
 Amy Bruckner as Annie
 Fred Stoller as Late Carl
 Katt Micah Williams as Preacher Don's sidekick
 Beau Billingslea as NCBA board member
 Cody Linley as Larry Burgess, Jr.
 Robert Rusler as Falcon coach

Release

Critical reception
Rebound received negative reviews from critics. On Rotten Tomatoes, the film holds a 14% rating, based on 91 reviews, with an average rating of 3.71/10. The site's consensus reads, "Rebound ought to entertain its target audience, but there's nothing here for those who've seen The Bad News Bears or its countless derivatives." On Metacritic, the film has a score of 36 out of 100, based on 25 critics, indicating "generally unfavorable reviews".

Box office
The film opened on July 1, 2005 and grossed $5,033,848 in its opening weekend, hitting #7; by the end of its run, the film had grossed $16,809,014 domestically and $683,000 internationally for a worldwide total of $17,492,014. Compared to its budget of $33.1 million, Rebound was a flop.

Music
 Songs featured in the film
 Treat 'Em Right by Chubb Rock
 What's Up Doc? (Can We Rock) by Fu-Schnickens
 Sweet Georgia Brown by Brother Bones
 Brick House by The Commodores
 Sledgehammer by Peter Gabriel
 Keep Movin' by Dub Pistols
 (Every Time I Turn Around) Back in Love Again by L.T.D.
 Take Me to the Next Phase by The Isley Brothers
 Hands Up by The Black Eyed Peas
 Jump Around by House of Pain
 Hey Ya! by Outkast
 Puppy Love by Paul Anka
 Unbelievable by EMF
 Eye of the Tiger by Survivor

References

External links
 
 
 
 
 

2005 films
2000s sports comedy films
20th Century Fox films
American basketball films
American children's comedy films
American sports comedy films
Films directed by Steve Carr
Films scored by Teddy Castellucci
Films with screenplays by Jon Lucas and Scott Moore
Films shot in Los Angeles
2005 comedy films
Middle school films
2000s English-language films
2000s American films